The 1968 Penn Quakers football team represented the University of Pennsylvania in the 1968 NCAA University Division football season.

Schedule

References

Penn
Penn Quakers football seasons
Penn Quakers football